La Garde-Freinet (Provençal: La Gàrdia Frainet) is a commune in the Var department in the Côte d'Azur area in southeastern France.

Location
La Garde-Freinet is a medieval French mountain village, located in the Massif des Maures, 15 km northwest of Saint-Tropez. It is accessible via picturesque winding roads that run through forests of cork, oaks, and chestnuts.

History
The village was the site of Fraxinet, an Arab settlement of the ninth to tenth centuries.

Sights
Established in the 11th century, the village has preserved its character with its field stone houses, old fashioned street names, and a village square framed with restaurants and local art galleries.  From atop old Fort Freinet one can see the plains of Saint-Clément and the Argens valley, all the way to the Alps.

People
 André Pousse (1919 - 2005) French actor

See also
Communes of the Var department

References

External links

 Tourist Office La Garde Freinet
 Images of La Garde-Freinet (site in French)

Communes of Var (department)